The Arlington-Washington Futurity is a Listed horse race for Thoroughbred two-year-olds. It is scheduled to run at a distance of one mile on the turf at Arlington Park, Arlington Heights, Illinois every fall and as at 2020 offers a purse of $100,000.

It was run as the American National Futurity in 1927 and 1928 and as the Arlington Futurity Stakes from 1932 through 1961. In 1962, the Arlington Futurity and Washington Park Futurity Stakes were merged to create the Arlington-Washington Futurity.

Raced at Washington Park Race Track from 1943 to 1945, and as a result of the 1985 fire, at Hawthorne Race Course in 1985. It was not run from 1929 through 1931 as well as 1970, 1988, 1995, 1998 and 1999.

Former Race Names:

 Arlington-Washington Futurity: 1962–2003, and 2007 to present
 Arlington-Washington Breeders' Cup Futurity: 2004–2006 
 American National Futurity: 1927–1928
 Arlington Futurity: 1932–1961
 Washington Park Futurity Stakes: 1937–1961

Distances:

 1 Mile: 1984, 1986–2013, 2020 to present
 7 Furlongs: 1962–1969, 1979–1983, 2014–2019
 6 ½ Furlongs: 1974–1978, 1985
 6 Furlong: 1927–1961, 1971–1973

Winners since 1962 

 † In 2008, Jose Adan and Advice finished first and second, respectively, but were disqualified and set back to second and third.
 In 2006, there was a dead heat between Officer Rocket and Got the Last Laugh.
‡‡ In 1971 the race was run in two divisions
‡ In 1967 the race was run in two divisions

References

External links
 Arlington Park website

1927 establishments in Illinois
Horse races in Illinois
Arlington Park
Flat horse races for two-year-olds
Ungraded stakes races in the United States
Recurring sporting events established in 1927